Mihaela Maevska (Bulgarian Cyrillic: Михаела Маевска, born 4 October 1990 in Sofia) is a Bulgarian Group rhythmic gymnast. She was part of the Bulgarian group that won bronze in group all-around at the 2016 Summer Olympics. She also won gold at the 2014 World Championships in Group all-around and bronze at the 2011 World Championships.

Career 
Maevska has been practicing gymnastics since the age of 7, when she was a first grader. In June 2014, she and her fellow gymnasts from the Bulgarian group won a gold medal in the 10 clubs event of the 2014 Rhythmic Gymnastics European Championships. In September 2014, Maevska and her teammates won gold in the group all-around at the 2014 World Championships, a milestone success, as this occurred 17 years after the Bulgarian group had last claimed gold - at the 1996 World Championships. The team also earned a silver medal in 3 Balls + 2 Ribbons at the 2014 event.

On 22 December 2014, Maevska and the other members of the national gymnastics squad were chosen as the team of the year in Bulgarian sport.

Maevska was member of the Bulgarian group that competed at the 2016 Summer Olympics in Rio de Janeiro, Brazil, together with Lyubomira Kazanova, Reneta Kamberova, Tsvetelina Naydenova, Hristiana Todorova.  They won the Group All-around bronze medal. They dedicated their medal to their teammate Tsvetelina Stoyanova, who attempted to commit suicide and fell from her apartment in Sofia. Maevska was the flag bearer for Bulgaria during the closing ceremony. Since 2017, Maevska has been assistant coach to the Senior Bulgarian group.

Detailed Olympic results

References

External links
 
 
 

1990 births
Living people
Bulgarian rhythmic gymnasts
Gymnasts at the 2012 Summer Olympics
Gymnasts at the 2016 Summer Olympics
Olympic gymnasts of Bulgaria
Gymnasts from Sofia
Medalists at the Rhythmic Gymnastics European Championships
Medalists at the Rhythmic Gymnastics World Championships
Olympic bronze medalists for Bulgaria
Medalists at the 2016 Summer Olympics
European Games competitors for Bulgaria
Gymnasts at the 2015 European Games